Ulvan is a village on the island of Ulvøya in the municipality of Hitra in Trøndelag county, Norway. Ulvan is home to a large fish processing plant operated by Marine Harvest.

References

Hitra
Villages in Trøndelag